The Door of Prophecies or Gate of Prophecies is a large door inside the Syrian Monastery in Wadi El Natrun (Natron Valley) in northern Egypt. It features symbolic diagrams depicting the past and the future of the Christian faith through the eyes of Christian monks of the tenth century. The Door of Prophecies dates to the beginning of the tenth century, around 913–914 AD according to the Syriac language inscriptions on it, during the papacy of Pope Gabriel I of Alexandria (910–921), when the location was used mainly by Syrian monks. Today the monastery is used and preserved by Coptic monks and the Coptic Church, as both Churches have been in friendship and alliance since early Christianity. The panels on the large door divide and represent Christian epochs through time, from the early church to the predicted end times.

Description 
The door of prophecies is a screen of the main sanctuary inside the monastery. It consists of six vertical leaves (panels) and seven horizontal rows, three forming a valve on each side. Each one of the six leaves has seven panels of ebony magnificently inlaid with ivory, however, today some of the panels are not in their original condition. From top to bottom they represent seven epochs which are believed to cover the history of Christianity, its past and future, highlighting its golden age, periods of major changes, hardships, and persecution. 

The historical and spiritual interpretations of the panels are highly individual. The following are the seven epochs:

References 

Christian monasteries in Egypt
Coptic Orthodox monasteries
Prophecy in Christianity
Individual doors

External links 
The Syrian Monastery